Meik is a surname. Notable people with the surname include:

Charles Meik (1853–1923), British civil and mechanical engineer
Janet Meik Wright, American legal scholar
Patrick Meik (1851–1910), British civil engineer, brother of Charles and son of Thomas
Thomas Meik (1812–1896), British engineer